James Huston may refer to:
 James Huston (typographer) (1820–1854), Canadian typographer, journalist and author
 James Huston (Canadian politician) (1845–1922), politician in Manitoba, Canada
 James N. Huston (1849–1927), U.S. Treasurer
 James W. Huston (mayor), former mayor of Boise in Idaho Territory
 James W. Huston (author) (1953–2016), American author and lawyer

See also 
 James Archibald Houston (1921–2005), Canadian artist, designer, children's author and film-maker
 Jim Houston (1937–2018), former American football player